Michael Shelley may refer to:

Michael Shelley (runner) (born 1983), Australian marathon runner and Commonwealth Games medallist
Michael Shelley (musician), New York-based musician
Michael Shelley (mathematician) (born 1959), American applied mathematician at the Courant Institute of Mathematical Sciences, New York University

See also 
Michael Schelle, pronounced Shelley, composer
Mike Shelley (born 1972), rugby union player
Michael Shelly (Irish politician)